In Egyptian mythology, Adim is a son of Budasheer and a king of Egypt. After the Great Flood, Adim consulted with his father's ghost, who told him how to distill drinking water from the salt water in a deep cave. He built the first installation for distilling fresh water from sea water in a deep vast cave.

References 

Egyptian mythology